AKM Alim Ullah (born 25 January 1955) is a politician from Khagrachhari District of Bangladesh. He was elected a member of parliament from Khagrachhari District Hill Tracts (Jatiya Sangsad Constituency) in 1986 and 1988 Bangladeshi general election.

Birth and early life 
AKM Alim Ullah was born on 25 January 1955 in Ramgarh, Khagrachhari district in the Chittagong Hill Tracts.

Career 
AKM Alim Ullah is the advisor of Khagrachhari district Awami League. He joined Awami League from Jatiya Party in 2002. He was elected a Member of Parliament from Khagrachhari District Hill Tracts (Jatiya Sangsad Constituency) as a Jatiya Party candidate in the 1986 Bangladeshi general election and 1988 Bangladeshi general election.

In 1985, he was elected chairman of Ramgarh Upazila in the first Upazila Parishad elections.

References

External links

Living people
1955 births
People from Khagrachhari District
Awami League politicians
3rd Jatiya Sangsad members
4th Jatiya Sangsad members
20th-century Bengalis
21st-century Bengalis